Joe O'Sullivan (born 1936 in Beara, County Cork) is an Irish former sportsperson. He played Gaelic football with his local club Beara and was a member of the Cork senior inter-county team in the 1950s.

References

1936 births
Living people
Beara Gaelic footballers
Cork inter-county Gaelic footballers
Irish athletes